Orleans is an unincorporated community in Appanoose County, Iowa, United States.

History
Orleans was laid out in 1851. A post office was established in Orleans in 1860, and remained in operation until it was discontinued in 1887.

References

Unincorporated communities in Appanoose County, Iowa
1851 establishments in Iowa
Populated places established in 1851
Unincorporated communities in Iowa